Patrick Pimblett (born 3 January 1995) is an English professional mixed martial artist. He currently competes in the Lightweight division in the Ultimate Fighting Championship (UFC). A professional since 2012, Pimblett is a former Cage Warriors Featherweight Champion.

Early life 
Paddy Pimblett was born on 3 January 1995 and grew up in Huyton, Merseyside. He attended St Margaret Mary's Primary school and Cardinal Heenan Catholic High school. Influenced by the fight between Diego Sanchez and Clay Guida at The Ultimate Fighter 9 Finale, he started training in mixed martial arts at the age of 14, joining Next Generation MMA and deciding he would compete in the sport for a living shortly after.

Career

Early career 
Pimblett made his debut in 2012, aged 17, racking up a 3–0 record before signing with Cage Warriors a year later. In 2016, he claimed the Cage Warriors featherweight championship, beating Johnny Frachey at the Echo Arena in Liverpool, and defended it once against Julian Erosa, winning a somewhat controversial unanimous decision. In April 2017, Pimblett lost it against Nad Narimani and moved up to lightweight. After a win, he challenged for the Cage Warriors lightweight championship, losing by unanimous decision to Søren Bak. After two more wins in the organisation, Pimblett signed a contract with the Ultimate Fighting Championship. Pimblett had previously declined two UFC deals, getting better financial offers from Cage Warriors.

Ultimate Fighting Championship 
Pimblett made his promotional debut against Luigi Vendramini on 4 September 2021, at UFC Fight Night 191. Pimblett won the bout via knockout in the first round. This fight earned him a Performance of the night bonus. In October 2021, Pimblett signed an endorsement deal with Barstool Sports worth over $1,000,000.

Pimblett faced Rodrigo Vargas on 19 March 2022 at UFC Fight Night 204. He won the fight via submission in round one. With this win, he received his second consecutive Performance of the Night award. Paddy would later reveal he made $12,000 to show and $12,000 to win.

Pimblett next faced Jordan Leavitt on 23 July 2022 at UFC Fight Night: Blaydes vs. Aspinall. He won the fight via rear-naked choke submission in the second round. This win earned him the Performance of the Night award.

Pimblett faced Jared Gordon on 10 December 2022 at UFC 282. He won the bout via unanimous decision. The decision was met with controversy, as many media outlets, fighters, and fans expressed their belief that Gordon had won the fight. 23 out of 24 media sources scored the fight in favour of Gordon.

Personal life 
Pimblett is a close friend of fellow mixed martial artist Molly McCann.

Pimblett describes himself as a socialist and an opponent of the Conservative Party. He supports the Liverpool-wide boycott of The Sun newspaper.

Pimblett has said that his trademark floppy hair and lack of tattoos allows children to identify with him in a way that would not be possible for them to do if he was "a big hard fella with lots of tattoos". He is a supporter of Liverpool FC and has expressed a desire to fight at the team's home stadium of Anfield.

Championships and accomplishments 
 Ultimate Fighting Championship
 Performance of the Night (Three times) 
 Cage Warriors Fighting Championship
 CWFC Featherweight Championship (one time, former)
 One successful title defence
 Full Contact Contender
 FCC Featherweight Championship. (one time, former)
 One successful title defence
 World MMA Awards
 2022 Breakthrough Fighter of the Year

Mixed martial arts record 

|-
|Win
|align=center|20–3
|Jared Gordon
|Decision (unanimous)
|UFC 282
|
|align=center|3
|align=center|5:00
|Las Vegas, Nevada, United States
|
|-
|Win
|align=center|19–3
|Jordan Leavitt
|Submission (rear-naked choke)
|UFC Fight Night: Blaydes vs. Aspinall
|
|align=center|2
|align=center|2:46
|London, England
|
|-
|Win
|align=center|18–3
|Rodrigo Vargas
|Submission (rear-naked choke)
|UFC Fight Night: Volkov vs. Aspinall
|
|align=center|1
|align=center|3:50
|London, England
|
|-
|Win
|align=center|17–3
|Luigi Vendramini
|KO (punches)
|UFC Fight Night: Brunson vs. Till
|
|align=center|1
|align=center|4:25
|Las Vegas, Nevada, United States
|
|-
|Win
|align=center|16–3
|Davide Martinez
|Submission (rear-naked choke)
|Cage Warriors 122
|
|align=center|1
|align=center|1:37
|London, England
|
|-
|Win
|align=center|15–3
|Decky Dalton
|TKO (punches)
|Cage Warriors 113
|
|align=center|1
|align=center|2:51
|Manchester, England
|
|-
|Loss
|align=center|14–3
|Søren Bak
|Decision (unanimous)
|Cage Warriors 96
|
|align=center|5
|align=center|5:00
|Liverpool, England
|
|-
|Win
|align=center|14–2
|Alexis Savvidis
|Submission (flying triangle choke)
|Cage Warriors 90
|
|align=center|2
|align=center|0:53
|Liverpool, England
|
|-
|Loss
|align=center|13–2
|Nad Narimani
|Decision (unanimous)
|Cage Warriors 82
|
|align=center|5
|align=center|5:00
|Liverpool, England
|
|-
|Win
|align=center|13–1
|Julian Erosa
|Decision (unanimous)
|Cage Warriors: Unplugged 1
|
|align=center|5
|align=center|5:00
|London, England
|
|-
|Win
|align=center|12–1
|Johnny Frachey
|TKO (punches)
|Cage Warriors 78
|
|align=center|1
|align=center|1:35
|Liverpool, England
|
|-
|Win
|align=center|11–1
|Teddy Violet
|Submission (rear-naked choke)
|Cage Warriors 77
|
|align=center|2
|align=center|2:28
|London, England
|
|-
|Win
|align=center|10–1
|Ashleigh Grimshaw
|Decision (unanimous)
|Cage Warriors 75
|
|align=center|3
|align=center|5:00
|London, England
|
|-
|Win
|align=center|9–1
|Miguel Haro
|Submission (rear-naked choke)
|Full Contact Contender 13
|
|align=center|1
|align=center|4:46
|Manchester, England
|
|-
|Win
|align=center|8–1
|Kevin Petshi
|Submission (rear-naked choke)
|Full Contact Contender 12
|
|align=center|2
|align=center|1:56
|Manchester, England
|
|-
|Win
|align=center|7–1
|Stephen Martin
|TKO (doctor stoppage)
|Cage Warriors 73
|
|align=center|1
|align=center|5:00
|Newcastle, England
|
|-
|Win
|align=center|6–1
|Conrad Hayes
|Submission (triangle armbar)
|Cage Warriors 68
|
|align=center|1
|align=center|3:17
|Liverpool, England
|
|-
|Win
|align=center|5–1
|Martin Sheridan
|Decision (unanimous)
|Cage Warriors 65
|
|align=center|3
|align=center|5:00
|Dublin, Ireland
|
|-
|Loss
|align=center|4–1
|Cameron Else
|Technical Submission (anaconda choke)
|Cage Warriors 60
|
|align=center|1
|align=center|0:35
|London, England
|
|-
|Win
|align=center|4–0
|Florian Calin
|Decision (unanimous)
|Cage Warriors 56
|
|align=center|3
|align=center|5:00
|London, England
|
|-
|Win
|align=center|3–0
|Jack Drabble
|TKO (punches)
|OMMAC 17
|
|align=center|1
|align=center|0:21
|London, England
|
|-
|Win
|align=center|2–0
|Dougie Scott
|Submission (flying triangle choke)
|Cage Contender Fight Stars
|
|align=center|1
|align=center|2:09
|Liverpool, England
|
|-
|Win
|align=center|1–0
|Nathan Thompson
|TKO (submission to strikes)
|OMMAC 15
|
|align=center|1
|align=center|1:51
|Liverpool, England
|
|-

See also 
 List of current UFC fighters
 List of male mixed martial artists

Notes

References

External links 
 
 

Living people
English male mixed martial artists
Mixed martial artists utilizing Muay Thai
Mixed martial artists utilizing Brazilian jiu-jitsu
English male kickboxers
English Muay Thai practitioners
Ultimate Fighting Championship male fighters
English practitioners of Brazilian jiu-jitsu
People awarded a black belt in Brazilian jiu-jitsu
1995 births
People from Huyton
Sportspeople from Knowsley, Merseyside
Martial artists from Liverpool
Barstool Sports people